The University of Rzeszów is a university in Rzeszów, Poland. The patron of the university is Saint Queen Jadwiga of Poland.

It was officially established in 2001 by combining several older institutions in the city.
The current university comprises the former:

 Rzeszów branch of the Maria Curie-Skłodowska University
 Higher School of Education 
 Economics department of the Hugo Kołłątaj Academy of Agriculture

The school has over 22,000 students.

Faculties

 Faculty of Biology and Agriculture
 Faculty of Economics
 Faculty of Philology
 Faculty of Mathematics and Nature
 Faculty of Medicine 
 Faculty of Pedagogy and Art 
 Faculty of Law
 Faculty of Sociology and History
 Faculty of Physical Education 
 Branch Campus of the Faculty of Biotechnology

Interfaculty Units

 Interfaculty Institute of Philosophy 
 Practical Foreign Languages Teaching College 
 "POLONUS" Centre of Polish Culture and Language for Poles from Abroad and Foreigners 
 Culture and Education Studies 
 College of Physical Education and Sport 
 European Academy for the Carpathian Euroregion 
 Academic Sports Association "AZS" University Club

See also
List of universities in Poland

References

External links
University homepage

University of Rzeszów
Buildings and structures in Podkarpackie Voivodeship